The Crimean Tatar civil rights movement was a loosely-organized movement among the exiled Crimean Tatar nation that manifested throughout the second half of the 20th century, with the primary goals of regaining recognition as a distinct ethnic group, the right to live in Crimea, and restoration of the Crimean ASSR. Although the origins of the movement date back to the 1950s when its leaders were originally exclusively composed of party workers and Red Army veterans, who were confident that the union would soon fully rehabilitate them in accordance with proper adherence to Leninist national policy, as decades passed and the party remained hostile to even the most basic requests from Crimean Tatar petitions and deletions, a split eventually emerged in the movement; many youths who were deported as children gave up hope in communism and took issue with the Leninist line towed by leaders of the movement. Eventually in 1989 the Soviet government lifted the restrictions on moving to Crimea from all exiled Crimean Tatars, and began the rehabilitation process. Since then, in the period of a few years, over 200,000 Crimean Tatars returned to Crimea, but they continue to lack the status of titular people in any part of Crimea.

References 

Politics of the Crimean Tatars